Kladovo (or ) is a town and municipality located in the Bor District of eastern Serbia. It is situated on the right bank of the Danube river. The population of the town is 8,913, while the population of the municipality is 20,635 (2011 census).

Name
In Serbian, the town is known as Kladovo (Кладово), in Romanian Cladova, in German as Kladowo or Kladovo and in Latin and Romanised Greek as Zanes. In the time of the Roman Empire, the name of the town was Zanes while the fortifications was known as Diana and Pontes (from Greek "sea" -pontos, or Roman "bridge" - pontem). Emperor Trajan had a number of fortications constructed in the area during the Roman times, such as the well-known Trajan's Bridge (Pontes was built on the Serbian side, Theodora was built on the Romanian side). Later, Slavs founded a settlement that was named Novi Grad (Нови Град), while Ottomans built a fortress here and called it Fethülislam. The present-day name of Kladovo is first recorded in 1596 in an Austrian military document.

There are several theories about the origin of the current name of the town:
 According to one theory (Ranka Kuic), name of the town derived from Celtic word "kladiff" meaning "cemetery" in English.
 According to another theory (Ranko Jakovljevic), the name derived from the word "klad" (a device used to hold a person shackled).
 A third theory has it that the name derives from the Slavic word "kladenac" meaning "a well" in English or from the Slavic word "klada" meaning "(tree) stump".
 There is also a theory that the name goes back to the Bulgarian duke Glad, who ruled over this region in the 9th century.

There is a settlement with the same name in Russia near Moscow and it is believed that this settlement was founded by Serbs who moved there from Serbian Kladovo in the 18th century. One of the suburbs of Berlin also has this name, which originates from the Slavic Lusatian Serbs (Sorbs) who live in eastern Germany.

The name is also found in the Arad and Timiș counties of Romania, Cladova, in Arad county Cladova, Arad, Cladova in Timiș county Cladova, Timiș

Geography

East of the town are the sandy region of Kladovski Peščar, black locust forests, and a marshy area called Kladovski Rit, which used to be a large fish pond. It is home to 140 species of birds, of which 80 nest in the area. There are mixed colonies of pygmy cormorants and herons, while other birds include swans, white-tailed eagles, European bee-eaters, and numerous ducks. The surrounding area is a hunting ground for wild boars. Neighboring geographical localities, such as Osojna and Lolićeva Česma, are popular local excursion areas.

Climate
Kladovo has a  humid subtropical climate (Köppen climate classification: Cfa).

History
Early Bronze Age pottery of the Kostolac-Kocofeni culture was found in Donje Butorke, Kladovo, as well as several miniature duck-shaped vases of 14th century BC in Mala Vrbica and Korbovo. Bronze Age necropolis with rituals, pottery (decorated with meander) and other significant archaeological items were found in Korbovo.

In ancient times, a fortification near Trajan's bridge named Zanes/Pontes existed at this location, the area was governed by the Dacian Albocense tribe. In the Middle Ages, Slavs founded here new town named Novi Grad (Нови Град), but it was razed by the Hungarians in 1502. It was rebuilt in 1524 by the Ottomans and received new name: Fethi Islam (Fethülislam). According to Ottoman traveler, Evliya Çelebi, who visited the town in 1666, most of its inhabitants spoke local Slavic language  and Turkish language, while some also spoke Romanian.  In 1784, the population of Kladovo numbered 140 Muslim and 50 Christian houses. 

From 1929 to 1941, Kladovo was part of the Morava Banovina of the Kingdom of Yugoslavia.

Settlements
Aside from the town of Kladovo, the municipality includes the following settlements:
Towns
 Kladovo
 Brza Palanka
Villages

 Vajuga
 Velesnica
 Velika Vrbica
 Velika Kamenica
 Grabovica
 Davidovac
 Kladušnica
 Korbovo
 Kostol
 Kupuzište
 Ljubičevac
 Mala Vrbica
 Manastirica
 Milutinovac
 Novi Sip
 Petrovo Selo
 Podvrška
 Reka
 Rečica
 Rtkovo
 Tekija na Dunavu

Demographics

According to the 2011 census results, the municipality has a population of 20,635 inhabitants.

Ethnic groups
The ethnic composition of the municipality:

Economy
The main business are the hydro-electric power plants of Đerdap: Iron Gate I and Iron Gate II. Other businesses began primarily to support the building and operation of the power plant, and the local folk.

The population of the villages around Kladovo is mostly supported by the family members who work in the countries of western Europe, agriculture is a side activity more than an income-generating one.

The following table gives a preview of total number of registered people employed in legal entities per their core activity (as of 2018):

Features
Kladovo has one hospital, two daycare and kindergarten centers, one elementary school (grades 1 through 8), one high school and several vocational schools.

Though the river Danube is very polluted by international standards, many people still fish in it. Before the power plant was built, sturgeon caviar from this area was very popular and was exported as a delicacy to the western Europe and the United States. In the 1960s, up to 3 tons of caviar yearly was exported from Kladovo. However, the records from the past, dated in 1793, report of the sturgeon which had . Also, roe was turned into the caviar using the dry method.

The nearby archeological sites include the remnants of Roman Emperor Trajan's bridge, a Trajan table, remnants of Trajan's road through the Danube's Iron Gates, and the Roman fortress Diana.

The Trajan's Bridge is located 5 km downstream from Kladovo. It had 20 pillars and was 1,200 m long. Trajan's successor Hadrian partially demolished it to prevent the raids of the Dacians and the bridge was later neglected. The bridge is depicted in a relief on the Trajan's Column in Rome. Until the 16th century, it was the largest bridge ever built. The 20 pillars were still visible in 1856, when the level of the Danube hit a record low. In 1906, the Commission of the Danube decided to destroy two of the pillars that were obstructing navigation. In 1932, there were 16 pillars remaining underwater, but in 1982 only 12 were mapped by archaeologists; the other four had probably been swept away by water. Only the entrance pillars are now visible on either bank of the Danube.

When the artificial Đerdap Lake was formed from 1967-72 as a result of the Iron Gate I Hydroelectric Power Station. The lake inundated the old Roman road along the coast and the only remaining part of the old path is the Tabula Traiana, a Roman memorial plaque, which was elevated for 25 m. The process of lifting the table (4 m x 1.75 m) lasted from 1966 to 1969, today is several meters above the lake level and is observable only from the lake.

Remains of the fortress Diana are located 2 km downstream of the Iron Gate I. Diana is one of the largest and best preserved Roman forts on this section of the Danubian Limes. It was built by the emperor Trajan at the beginning of the 2nd century BC and was destroyed by the joint attack of the Slavs and Pannonian Avars in the 6th century.

During the Ottoman occupation of the Balkan peninsula a fortress was built near the town. Construction began in 1524 and the present look of Fetislam dates from the period of Suleiman the Magnificent in the mid 16th century. The construction was supervised by Malkoçoğlu Balı Bey, while the architect was Osman Pasha. It consists of "Big Town" and "Little Town", which represent two levels of the fortress' defense. It was very important for the Ottomans as, due to its location, domineered the Iron Gate gorge. Fetislam has round, two-storeys high towers. The rectangular cannon fortification with six round bastions, Fetislam became important military structure up to the end of World War I. It was damaged in World War II and by the neglect after the war. In 1968 conversion into the sport complex slowly began and it was partially renovated in 1973, including the amphitheater. The fortress was endangered with the rise of the Danube water level with the construction of the massive Iron Gate dam. Today, it contains children's playgrounds, track and soccer fields, handball, volleyball and tennis courts.

The Đerdap national park offers scenic views, excellent hunting grounds, and many trails for hiking (most trails are not well marked or maintained, so hiking is recommended only for the experienced).

The town has two hotels: "Đerdap" and "Aquastar Danube". Nearby the city (8 km on the road to Belgrade) there is a youth camp named "Karataš" (Turkish kara-tash for "black stone") which can host some of the visiting tourists. Kladovo has many cafés and restaurants, some offering live music entertainment late into the night. The town's quay stretches about  along the Danube river and is used for walking and cycling.

Kladovo has a beach, Đerdap Archaeology Museum, Orthodox Church of Saint George and a pedestrian zone (Kladovo Skadarlija). Kladovo is on the European bicycle path and in 2016 about 16,000 cyclists passed through the town. As of 2017, the bus line Belgrade-Kladovo was the only one in Serbia which had bicycle carriers on the buses.
The neighboring villages of Tekija and Brza Palanka also arranged beaches on the river. Other touristic attractions include the organized visits to the Iron Gate I power plant, local cuisine and the surrounding wine region between Kladovo and Negotin, the Negotin Valley. In the 19th century, the wine produced here was shipped to Belgrade, Novi Sad, Budapest, Vienna, etc.

The public market was open in 1586, when the Ottomans moved the seat of nahiyah to Fetislam tower. In the mid-19th century, it was recorded that the market is open on Saturdays. In the mid-20th century, the market was equipped with the concrete market stalls, receiving little maintenance until 2019, when more extensive renovation works begun.

Gallery

Notable residents
Born in Kladovo municipality:
 Avram Petronijević, born in Tekija (Kladovo)
 Darko Perić, actor, born in Kladovo
Temporary residents:
 Nicodemus of Tismana (14-15th century)
 Vuk Stefanović Karadžić, a Serbian linguist and reformer of the Serbian language

See also
 Kladovo transport

References

External links

 
 Library Cultural Center Kladovo 

Populated places in Bor District
Timok Valley
Municipalities and cities of Southern and Eastern Serbia